Pierce Township is a township in Page County, Iowa, USA.

History
Pierce Township was established in 1858.
The railroad was built through Pierce Township in 1870.

References

Townships in Page County, Iowa
Townships in Iowa